Knutby is a locality situated in Uppsala Municipality, Uppsala County, Sweden, with 564 inhabitants in 2010.

Knutby's sports club, Knutby IF, was established in 1938 and its activities include football, skiing, gymnastics and athletics.

See also
Knutby murder

References 

Populated places in Uppsala County
Populated places in Uppsala Municipality